Tessa M. Gorman (born 1970/1971) is an American lawyer from Washington who served as the Acting United States Attorney for the Western District of Washington in 2021. She is as an Assistant United States Attorney for the same district. In 2018, President Donald Trump announced that he planned to nominate her to become a United States district judge of the same court, but the nomination was never submitted to the U.S. Senate.

Education 

Gorman earned her Bachelor of Arts from Yale University, where she was a member of the varsity track and field team, and her Juris Doctor from the UC Berkeley School of Law, where she served as an editor of the California Law Review.

Legal career 

After graduating from law school, Gorman served as a law clerk to Judge Douglas P. Woodlock of the United States District Court for the District of Massachusetts.

After completing her clerkship, Gorman served as an Honors Trial Attorney in the United States Department of Justice Criminal Division, assigned to the Narcotics and Dangerous Drugs Section. She currently serves as an Assistant United States Attorney for the Western District of Washington, where she serves as the Chief of the Office's Criminal Division. On March 1, 2021, became the Acting U.S. Attorney after the resignation of Brian T. Moran.

Nomination to district court 

On July 13, 2018, President Donald Trump announced his intention to nominate Gorman to a seat on the United States District Court for the Western District of Washington. Gorman was to be nominated to the seat on the United States District Court for the Western District of Washington vacated by Judge Robert S. Lasnik, who took senior status on January 27, 2016. However, due to a dispute over a separate nomination, the nomination was never submitted to the Senate.

References 

1970s births
Living people
21st-century American lawyers
21st-century American women lawyers
Assistant United States Attorneys
People from Ukiah, California
United States Department of Justice lawyers
UC Berkeley School of Law alumni
Washington (state) lawyers
Yale College alumni